Browns Creek Township may refer to the following townships in the United States:

 Browns Creek Township, Jewell County, Kansas
 Browns Creek Township, Red Lake County, Minnesota